Jan Arends (11 September 1738, in Dordrecht – 22 April 1805, in Dordrecht) was a Dutch painter. He was the brother of the poet Roelof Arends. He was a pupil of J. Ponse, and painted landscapes and marine subjects. He laboured many years at Amsterdam and Middelburg, but returned eventually to Dordrecht, where he died in 1805. He was well skilled in perspective, and practised engraving.

References
 

1738 births
1805 deaths
18th-century Dutch painters
18th-century Dutch male artists
Artists from Dordrecht
Dutch landscape painters
Dutch male painters
Dutch marine artists